Andrés Mosquera (born July 9, 1978) is a Colombian football defender.

Titles

References

1978 births
Living people
Colombian footballers
Colombia international footballers
2000 CONCACAF Gold Cup players
2003 FIFA Confederations Cup players
Categoría Primera A players
Peruvian Primera División players
Deportivo Cali footballers
Cortuluá footballers
Sporting Cristal footballers
Independiente Medellín footballers
Monagas S.C. players
Millonarios F.C. players
Once Caldas footballers
Deportivo Pasto footballers
Atlético Nacional footballers
Atlético F.C. footballers
Colombian expatriate footballers
Expatriate footballers in Peru
Expatriate footballers in Venezuela
Association football defenders
Footballers from Cali